Aleksandr Sergeyevich Likhachyov (born 22 July 1996) is a Russian football player. He plays for FC Spartak Kostroma.

Club career
He made his debut in the Russian Football National League for FC Spartak-2 Moscow on 10 September 2016 in a game against FC Volgar Astrakhan.

On 20 February 2019, his Spartak Moscow contract was dissolved by mutual consent.

International
He won the 2013 UEFA European Under-17 Championship with the Russia national under-17 football team, he also participated with it in the 2013 FIFA U-17 World Cup. He was the runner-up of the 2015 UEFA European Under-19 Championship with the Russia national under-19 football team.

References

External links
 Profile by Russian Football National League

1996 births
Sportspeople from Izhevsk
Living people
Russian footballers
Association football defenders
Russia youth international footballers
Russia under-21 international footballers
FC Spartak-2 Moscow players
FC Tyumen players
FC Fakel Voronezh players
FC Zvezda Perm players
FC Spartak Kostroma players
Russian First League players
Russian Second League players